Hung Nguyen may refer to:

Places 
 Hưng Nguyên, a township and the capital of Hưng Nguyên District
 Hưng Nguyên District in the North Central Coast region of Vietnam

People